Card Warp is a card illusion that was created by magician Roy Walton. Card Warp has many variations in presentation and effect.

Card Warp starts out with the illusionist showing two cards. He then folds one card horizontally and the other one vertically. He slides the horizontal card into the vertical card so the horizontal card is inside of the vertical card. The illusionist then flips the cards over so that the vertical card is inside of the horizontal card. He slides the vertical card back and forth, and the card seemingly changes from front to back in the horizontal card. Both cards are then ripped down the middle and shown to be normal.

It is published by Michael Close in "Workers 1" as "Dr Strangetrick" subtitled "Or How I Stopped Worrying and Learned to Love Card Warp" and by Michael Ammar in "Easy To Master Card Miracles Volume Two".   Michael Close refers to the variation "Star Warp" published by Bob McCallister and Howie Schwartzman in "Apocalypse Volume 3 Number 7" which uses an American dollar bill. Ammar shows how two normal-sized playing cards can appear to be partially twisted. A performance is published by Eugene Burger in "Magical Voyages 3" in an effect called "The Inquisition" which uses large-sized playing cards.

Card magic